D-loop replication is a proposed process by which circular DNA like chloroplasts and mitochondria replicate their genetic material.  An important component of understanding D-loop replication is that many chloroplasts and mitochondria have a single circular chromosome like bacteria instead of the linear chromosomes found in eukaryotes. However, many chloroplasts and mitochondria have a linear chromosome, and D-loop replication is not important in these organelles. Also, not all circular genomes use D-loop replication as the process of replicating its genome.

In many organisms, one strand of DNA in the plasmid comprises heavier nucleotides (relatively more purines: adenine and guanine).  This strand is called the H (heavy) strand.  The L (light) strand comprises lighter nucleotides (pyrimidines: thymine and cytosine).  Replication begins with replication of the heavy strand starting at the D-loop (also known as the control region). A D-loop is a short portion in circular DNA that has three strands instead of two. The middle strand, which is complementary to the light strand, displaces the heavy strand and forms a displacement loop (D-loop). Circular DNA is stable with this small D-loop and can remain in this formation, but the middle strand, or the displacing strand, is replaced frequently due to its short half-life, and is very energetically expensive to the cell. When diagramed, the resulting structure looks like the letter D. The D-loop was first discovered in 1971 when researchers noticed that many DNA in the mitochondria they were examining under microscope contained a short segment that was tripled stranded.

Replication process
Each D-loop contains an origin of replication for the heavy strand. Full circular DNA replication is initiated at that origin and replicates in only one direction. The middle strand in the D-loop can be removed and a new one will be synthesized that is not terminated until the heavy strand is fully replicated, or the middle strand can serve as a primer for the heavy strand replication. As the heavy strand replication reaches the origin of replication for the light strand, a new light strand will be synthesized in the opposite direction as the heavy strand. There is more than one proposed process through which D-loop replication occurs, but in all of the models, these steps are agreed upon. The portions not agreed upon are what is the importance of maintaining a D-loop when replication is not in progress, because it is energetically expensive to the cell, and what mechanisms, during replication, preserve the detached strand of DNA that is waiting to be replicated.

Importance
The D-loop region is important for phylogeographic studies.  Because the region does not code for any genes, it is not imperative for this region to remain conserved over time, therefore, it is free to mutate with only a few selective limitations on size and heavy/light strand factors.  The mutation rate is among the fastest of anywhere in either the nuclear or mitochondrial genomes in animals. Using these mutations in the D-loop, recent and rapid evolutionary changes can effectively be tracked such as within species and among very closely related species. Due to the high mutation rate, it is not effective in tracking evolutionary changes that are not recent. This is a very common use of the D-loop in genomics.

One example of the use of D-loop mutations in phylogeographic studies was the phylogeny assembled using the highly unstudied red deer on the Iberian peninsula. Scientist tracked the D-loop polymorphisms within these red deer and determined the genetic relationship that these deer had among each other. They were also able to determine the relationships, based on D-loop similarities and differences, between these red deer and other deer throughout Europe.  In another example, scientist used the variations in the D-loop, along with microsatellite markers, to study and map out the genetic diversity among goats in Sri Lanka.

See also
D-loop
Mitochondrial DNA—useful in organisation of nucleoid of mitochondria
Organelle

References

External links
 Human Mitochondrial DNA Database
 Chloroplast DNA Database
 MtDNA Community Database

DNA